Hemicordulia kalliste is a species of dragonfly in the family Corduliidae, 
known as the slender emerald. It is uncommon and has been found in both Arnhem Land and Cape York, Australia.

Hemicordulia kalliste is a small to medium-sized, black and yellow dragonfly with long legs and a slender abdomen. In both males and females the inboard edge of the hindwing is rounded.
Hemicordulia kalliste appears similar to Hemicordulia continentalis.

Gallery

See also
 List of dragonflies of Australia

References

Corduliidae
Odonata of Australia
Insects of Australia
Endemic fauna of Australia
Taxa named by Günther Theischinger
Taxa named by J.A.L. (Tony) Watson
Insects described in 1991